Günther Ballier (18 October 1900 – 20 April 1980) was a German actor. He appeared in more than 80 films and television shows between 1933 and 1975.

Selected filmography
 The Country Schoolmaster (1933)
 What Am I Without You (1934)
 The Higher Command (1935)
 The Court Concert (1936)
 The Man Who Was Sherlock Holmes (1937)
 The Coral Princess (1937)
The Secret Lie (1938)
 Drei Unteroffiziere (1939)
  Escape in the Dark (1939)
 Men Are That Way (1939)
 Attack on Baku (1942)
  When the Young Wine Blossoms (1943)
 Melody of a Great City (1943)
 The Call of the Sea (1951)
 Effi Briest (1971)

References

External links

1900 births
1980 deaths
German male film actors
20th-century German male actors
Male actors from Berlin